The 2019–20 Utah Utes women's basketball team represents the University of Utah during the 2019–20 NCAA Division I women's basketball season. The Utes, led by fifth year head coach Lynne Roberts, play their home games at the Jon M. Huntsman Center and are members of the Pac-12 Conference.

Roster

Schedule and results 

|-
!colspan=9 style=| Exhibition

|-
!colspan=9 style=| Non-conference regular season

|-
!colspan=9 style=| Pac-12 regular season

|-
!colspan=9 style=| Pac-12 Women's Tournament

Rankings
2019–20 NCAA Division I women's basketball rankings

See also
2019–20 Utah Utes men's basketball team

References 

Utah Utes women's basketball seasons
Utah
Utah Utes
Utah Utes